Carabus exiguus lanzhouicus is a black-coloured subspecies of ground beetle in the subfamily Carabinae that is endemic to Gansu, China.

References

exiguus lanzhouicus
Beetles described in 1989
Endemic fauna of Gansu